Golam Kader is a retired two star rank Bangladesh Army officer and Advisor of Caretaker Government led by Fakhruddin Ahmed.

Career
Kader served as the Director General of National Security Intelligence. He retired from Bangladesh Army with the rank of Major General. On 9 January 2008 he was appointed Advisor of Caretaker Government led by Fakhruddin Ahmed. He was in charge of the Ministry of communication.

References

Living people
Bangladesh Army generals
Advisors of Caretaker Government of Bangladesh
Year of birth missing (living people)
Directors General of National Security Intelligence